I'm Alone, No You're Not is the second studio album by American folk band Joseph. It was released by ATO Records on August 26, 2016, marking the trio's first full-length album release with the company. Produced by Mike Mogis, it reached number one on Billboards Heatseekers Albums chart.

Track listing

Charts

Release history

References

External links
 

2016 albums
Joseph (band) albums
ATO Records albums
Albums produced by Mike Mogis